Fat Man and Little Boy (released in the United Kingdom as Shadow Makers) is a 1989 epic historical 
war film directed by Roland Joffé who co-wrote the script with Bruce Robinson. The story follows the Manhattan Project, the secret Allied endeavor to develop the first nuclear weapons during World War II. The film is named after "Little Boy" and "Fat Man", the two bombs dropped on the Japanese cities of Hiroshima and Nagasaki respectively.

Plot
In September 1942, U.S. Army Corps of Engineers Colonel Leslie Groves (Paul Newman) who oversaw construction of the Pentagon is assigned to head the ultra-secret Manhattan Project, to beat the Germans, who have a similar nuclear weapons program.

Groves picks University of California, Berkeley, physicist J. Robert Oppenheimer (Dwight Schultz) to head the team of the project. Oppenheimer was familiar with northern New Mexico from his boyhood days when his family owned a cabin in the area. For the new research facility, he selects a remote location on top of a mesa adjacent to a valley called Los Alamos Canyon, northwest of Santa Fe.

The different personalities of the military man Groves and the scientist Oppenheimer often clash in keeping the project on track. Oppenheimer in turn clashes with the other scientists, who debate whether their personal consciences should enter into the project or whether they should remain purely researchers, with personal feelings set aside.

Nurse Kathleen Robinson (Laura Dern) and young physicist Michael Merriman (John Cusack) question what they are doing. Working with little protection from radiation during an experiment, Michael drops a radioactive component during an experiment dubbed Tickling the Dragon's Tail and retrieves it by hand in order to avoid disaster, but is exposed to a lethal dose of radiation. In the base hospital, nurse Kathleen can only watch as he develops massive swelling and deformation before dying a miserable death days later.

While the technical problems are being solved, investigations are undertaken in order to thwart foreign espionage, especially from communist sympathizers who might be associated with socialist organizations. The snooping reveals that Oppenheimer has had a young mistress, Jean Tatlock (Natasha Richardson), and he is ordered by Groves to stop seeing her. After he breaks off their relationship without being able to reveal the reasons why, she is unable to cope with the heartache and is later found dead, apparently a suicide.

As the project continues in multiple sites across America, technical problems and delays cause tensions and strife. To avoid a single point of failure plan, two separate bomb designs are implemented: a large, heavy plutonium bomb imploded using shaped charges ("Fat Man"), and an alternative design for a thin, less heavy uranium bomb triggered in a shotgun design ("Little Boy"). The bomb development culminates in a detonation in south-central New Mexico at the Trinity Site in the Alamogordo Desert (05:29:45 on July 16, 1945), where everyone watched in awe at the spectacle of the first mushroom cloud with roaring winds, even miles away.

In the end, both bombs, Fat Man and Little Boy, were successful, ushering in the Atomic Age.

Cast

 Paul Newman as General Leslie Groves
 Dwight Schultz as J. Robert Oppenheimer
 Bonnie Bedelia as Kitty Oppenheimer
 John Cusack as Michael Merriman
 Laura Dern as Kathleen Robinson 
 Ron Frazier as Peer de Silva
 Fred Thompson as Maj. Gen. Melrose Hayden Barry 
 John C. McGinley as Capt. Richard Schoenfield, MD
 Natasha Richardson as Jean Tatlock
 Ron Vawter as Jamie Latrobe
 Michael Brockman as William Sterling Parsons
 Del Close as Dr. Kenneth Whiteside
 John Considine as Robert Tuckson
 Allan Corduner as Franz Goethe
 Todd Field as Robert R. Wilson
 Ed Lauter as Whitney Ashbridge
 Franco Cutietta as Enrico Fermi
 Joe D'Angerio as Seth Neddermeyer
 Jon DeVries as Johnny Mount
 Gerald Hiken as Leo Szilard
 Barry Yourgrau as Edward Teller
 James Eckhouse as Robert Harper
 Mary Pat Gleason as Dora Welsh
 Clark Gregg as Douglas Panton
 Péter Halász as George Kistiakowsky
 Robert Peter Gale as Dr. Louis Hempelemann

Basis
Most of the characters were real people and most of the events real happenings, with some theatrical license used in the film.

The character of Michael Merriman (John Cusack) is a fictional composite of several people and is put into the film to provide a moral compass as the "common man". Part of the character is loosely based on the scientist Louis Slotin. Contrary to Merriman's death in the movie, Slotin's accident and death occurred after the dropping of the two bombs on Japan, and his early death was feared by some as karma after the event; see their respective articles. A very similar mishap happened less than two weeks after the Nagasaki bomb, claiming the life of Harry Daghlian. Both incidents occurred with the same plutonium core, which became known as the demon core.

Even before Oppenheimer was chosen to be the lead scientist of the Manhattan Project, he was under surveillance by the Federal Bureau of Investigation (FBI) due to suspected Communist sympathies. Once selected, the surveillance was constant: every single phone call was recorded and every contact with another person noted. After he was picked to head the laboratory, he only met with Tatlock one time, in mid-June 1943, where she told him that she still loved him and wanted to be with him. After spending that night together, he never saw her again. She committed suicide six months after their meeting.

Production
Filming took place in the fall of 1988 mainly outside Durango, Mexico, where the Los Alamos research facility was re-created. The re-creation of the Los Alamos laboratory entailed 35 buildings and cost over $2 million to construct in 1988.

Soundtrack
The film includes a musical score by long-time composer Ennio Morricone. The entire score and extra music were released in 2011 by La-La Land Records. The 2-CD release has source cues, portions of others, and alternate takes that were dropped from the final cut of the film. Produced by Dan Goldwasser and mastered by Mike Matessino. The CD includes liner notes by film music writer Daniel Schweiger. Only 3,000 copies were released.

Reception
The film has been criticized for distortion of history for dramatic effect, and miscasting in its choices of Paul Newman for the role of General Groves, and Dwight Schultz for the role of Oppenheimer. Noted critic Roger Ebert felt the film lackluster, giving it 1 and a 1/2 stars, and felt that "The story of the birth of the bomb is one of high drama, but it was largely intellectual drama, as the scientists asked themselves, in conversations and nightmares, what terror they were unleashing on the Earth. Fat Man and Little Boy reduces their debates to the childish level of Hollywood stereotyping." The film holds a 48% rating on review aggregate Rotten Tomatoes based on 21 reviews.

The film made under $4 million on its original release. The film was entered into the 40th Berlin International Film Festival.

See also
Day One, 1989 movie about The Manhattan Project
The Beginning or the End, 1947 docudrama film

References

External links

1989 films
Films about the Manhattan Project
Films about the atomic bombings of Hiroshima and Nagasaki
American films based on actual events
Films directed by Roland Joffé
Films scored by Ennio Morricone
Cultural depictions of J. Robert Oppenheimer
Paramount Pictures films
1980s English-language films
American war drama films
1980s American films